The Sikorsky S-33 Messenger was an American two-seat sesqiuplane designed and built by the Sikorsky Manufacturing Corporation in 1925.

The first of two examples built participated in the Sixth Pulitzer Trophy Race at Mitchel Field, Long Island, New York on October 12, 1925 and was piloted by Al Krapish, an employee of Sikorsky.

These were essentially the same engine type, post- and pre- acquisition of the Lawrance Aero Engine Company by the Wright Aeronautical Corporation, respectively. Some sources assert that the aircraft was powered by an Anzani engine, but this is most likely to be a mis-identification.

Specifications (first aircraft)

References

1920s United States civil utility aircraft
S-031
Sesquiplanes
Single-engined tractor aircraft
Aircraft first flown in 1925